La Journée de la jupe (Skirt Day) is a 2008 French film directed by Jean-Paul Lilienfeld and starring Isabelle Adjani as a high school teacher, a role which earned the actress the 2010 César award for Best Actress in a Leading Role.

A key point of the plot of the movie happened in real life: a request was sent to the French Minister of Education to propose a Skirt Day.

Plot
Sonia Bergerac (Adjani), who favours wearing a skirt, teaches French literature at a middle school in a poor immigrant-dominated neighborhood. She increasingly resents the daily burden of racist and sexist abuse from her violent unmotivated students, even more so since the departure of her husband. Her wearing of a skirt is considered sensitive given the school's large Muslim population, many of whom consider such clothing  immodest.

During the rehearsal of a theatre play with one of her classes, she finds a gun in a student's bag. She struggles to grab the gun, and a shot is fired accidentally that injures the student's leg. Totally overwhelmed, she loses control and takes her class hostage, opportunistically creating a proper — although biased — teaching environment.

While school, police and political authorities try to figure out what is going on and how to react, Sonia forces the students to see things her way and ultimately shows them the contradictions in their own lives. Most of them revolt against the macho bullies who abuse her and go over to her side.

When the police ask what conditions she sets for releasing the class, she asks that the government declare a Skirt Day in schools each year, when females can appear in skirts. She also asks for journalists who will publicise her case in the media. The police then get her father to speak to her and, when he switches to Arabic from French, the students realise that, like many of them, Sonia is also of North African origin.

When the journalists arrive, they are, in fact, policemen who fatally shoot her. At her funeral, the girl students all wear skirts.

Cast
 
Main Characters

 Isabelle Adjani as Sonia Bergerac, French literature teacher
 Denis Podalydès as Chief Labouret, RAID negotiator
 Yann Collette as Officer Bechet, Labouret's ranking officer, who wants to put a show of force
 Jackie Berroyer as school principal

Students in the class

 Yann Ebonge as Mouss
 Kévin Azaïs as Sébastien
 Karim Zakraoui as Farid
 Khalid Berkouz as Mehmet
 Sonia Amori as Nawel
 Sarah Douali as Farida
 Salim Boughidene as Jérôme
 Mélèze Bouzid as Khadija
 Hassan Mezhoud as Akim
 Fily Doumbia as Adiy

Secondary characters

 Nathalie Besançon as the Minister of the Interior
 Marc Citti as Frédéric Bergerac, Sonia's husband
 Olivier Brocheriou as Julien
 Anne Girouard as Cécile
 Stéphan Guérin-Tillié as François

Reception
The film was screened at the première of Berlin International film festival 2009, and was first broadcast on European culture TV channel Arte on March 20, 2009 before being released in cinemas on March 25, 2009. Lilienfeld said that the lack of funding prevented a typical theatre release and prompted a prior broadcast on TV. The inaugural release covered 50 cinemas, but this number grew because of growing public interest.

The movie was controversial because of its theme, viewpoint and the hurdles that led to an atypical cinema and TV release. It is debated whether the movie is "politically incorrect", especially in light of the success of similarly themed movie Entre les murs a few months earlier. It was nominated for Best Film at the 35th César Awards and Isabelle Adjani won a record fifth award for Best Actress. It was her first role in six years and considered to be a comeback for her.

German arts and culture TV channel ZDF Kultur produced a German language theatre play for television broadcast version entitled Verrücktes Blut.

References

External links
  
 

2000s feminist films
2008 films
2008 drama films
French feminist films
2000s French-language films
Films featuring a Best Actress César Award-winning performance
Films featuring a Best Actress Lumières Award-winning performance
French drama films
2000s French films